Prince Gurgen I (died 923) was a Georgian prince of the Bagrationi dynasty of Tao-Klarjeti branch.

He was a son of Prince Bagrat I of Klarjeti.

He became Bagrat's immediate successor, but he must have been a rather insignificant ruler since he had no official title. He had a posthumous son also called Gurgen who died in 968.

References 

923 deaths
Bagrationi dynasty of Klarjeti
10th-century rulers in Europe
Year of birth unknown